E353 may refer to:

 Metatartaric acid, a food additive in the E number series
 E353 series of Japanese trains